Aiyedire is a Local Government Area, one of the thirty Local Government Areas in Osun State, Nigeria. Hon. Adeboye Mukaila Oladejo had been its Chairman since 2017. The local government was named Iwo South Local Government on establishment which was later renamed Aiyedire Local Government which is its present name today. The local government was carved from the old Iwo local government which was in Araromi in Iwo.

Administration

Districts 
Aiyedire Local Government Area is divided into four districts namely Ile Ogbo, Kuta, Oke Osun (Alabata), and Olupona. For efficient administration purposes, Aiyedire South, a Local Council Development Area (LCDA) was created out of Aiyedire and headed by Hon. Olufemi Idowu.

Geography 
This Local Government Area is located in the western axis of Osun state. It is bounded by Ejigbo, Ola Oluwa, Irewole, Ayedaade and Iwo Local Government Areas. It has an area of 262 km and a population of 75,846 at the 2006 national census.  It features two distinct seasons, the dry and rainy seasons. The average temperature of Aiyedire is put at 28.5 °C while the humidity of the area is estimated at 60 percent. Wind speed across Aiyedire is put at 10 km/h.

Education

All the towns in the local government have their own community grammar school. And the local government has one functioning institution and which one is under construction; Offer Centre Institute of Agriculture, oluponna; Ilegbo university.

Demographics 
At the 2006 census, Aiyedire had a population of 76,309 (2006 estimates), and had grown to 105,100 (2016 projections). The 2006 estimates consist of the following:

Political wards 
Aiyedire has ten political wards namely Ileogbo i, Ileogbo ii, Ileogbo iii, Ileogbo iv, Kuta i, Kuta ii, Oke-osun, Oluponna 1, Oluponna 1i, and Oluponna 1ii. Aiyedire is a part of the famed Iwo Kingdom.

Economy

Agriculture 
Farming is the predominant economic activity. Cocoa is a major cash crop cultivated in the area solely or in combination with other agricultural crops such as coffee, cassava, palm oil, kola nut, maize, pineapple and yam.

Trade 
Trade is an important feature of the economic lives of the people with markets such as the Alaya main market and the Mosun market providing access for the exchange of a wide range of goods and services. Hunting and crop cultivation are other important economic enterprises engaged by the locals.

Postal code 
The postal code of the area is 232.

Socio-economic

Heritage

Sacred Idi-Oore Tree 
The tree is famed a pointer to the seating of Ileogbo, the headquarters of Ayedire Local Government in Osun State. The tree life span is uncertain as the first settlers are younger than it. The tree was located circa 1840 subsequent to a spiritual consultation with oracle by Prince Kuseela, the only surviving monarch from the war between Fulani and Ileogbo in 1822 where they were defeated. In 1840, as tranquility returned, it triggered Kuseela, to consult an oracle for a new abode as the former settlement was desolate. The oracle divined that he stops, with his entourage where ever he found a tree tied with white cloth. It was divined that he, with his people, should organize a prosperous kingdom. Prince Kuseela contacted the tree, weeded its surroundings, settled near at Akinmoyero`s compound and invited people from far and near and subsequently multiplied to about eighty-two compounds with numerous suburbs.

Tradition had it that the tree is manned by a male (Baba Abore) and a female (Iya Abore) appointed on the advice of the king. One of the past Iya Abore from Olukoun`s compound nicknamed the tree Alhaja Jabaru. This name is not unconnected with the female spirit the tree is said to shelter. Some traditionalists considered Oore as a strong protection against any havoc in Ileogbo. The tree does not shed its leaves under its shade.

Cultural activities

Anlugbua Festival 
Anlugbua is celebrated annually. Anlugbua Akindele, a famous hunter and warrior was a progenitor that led his people from Orile-Owu to Owu-Kuta, where they are presently settled. He left Orile-Owu because he was not given the chance to reign after his father’s passage. His younger brother was made to ascend the throne, which angered him. So, he left and later settled in a place called Ikutamiti (I evaded death). It is Ikutamiti that was shortened to Kuta.
After a reign of 300 years, he decided to sink to the ground, instead of dying physically. The spot where he entered into the ground is where is annually converged to celebrate. The place is now a local historical site.

The shrine is a sacred groove about three kilometres away from the town and inaccessible by vehicle and tucked inside the Anlugbua forest. Some of the rites are the sacrifices of live ram and dog in addition to pounded yam and okro/ogbono soup at the shrine. Persons who wear certain tribal marks called keke are forbidden from entering Anlugbua’s shrine.

Notable indigenes 
 Akin Ogunbiyi (Dr.) ACII, London – Chairman of Mutual Benefits Assurance Plc and 2018 gubernatorial candidate.
Mufutau Oloyede Abdul-Rahmon -  Professor of Arabic and Islamic Studies.

References

Local Government Areas in Osun State